Small World is a 1988 British television miniseries based on David Lodge's 1984 novel Small World: An Academic Romance.  Structured as six one-hour episodes, its producer was Steve Hawes, and its director was Robert Chetwyn.  Howard Schuman wrote the screenplay, in consultation with Lodge.  The titles of the six episodes are:
 Part 1 - 'April Is the Cruellest Month'
 Part 2 - 'The Lady of Situations'
 Part 3 - 'Unreal Cities'
 Part 4 - 'What Shall We Do Tomorrow?'
 Part 5 - 'Throbbing and Waiting'
 Part 6 - 'Hurry up Please, It's Time'

Each episode opens with Persse McGarrigle speaking into a tape recorder at the underground chapel at Heathrow Airport, for communication to his mentor Professor McCreedy.  Stuart Laing has described various changes and simplifications in the transition of the novel to the TV series.

Cast
 Finbar Lynch (Persse McGarrigle)
 Stephen Moore (Philip Swallow)
 John Ratzenberger (Morris Zapp)
 Sarah Badel (Hilary Swallow / Joy Simpson)
 Rachel Kempson (Miss Maiden)
 Leonie Mellinger (Angelica Pabst / Lily Pabst)
 Sheila Gish (Fulvia Morgana / Desirée Zapp)
 Anthony Newlands (Jacques Textel)
 Marc de Jonge (Michel Tardieu)
 Charles Gray (Rudyard Parkinson) 
 John Rogan (Professor McCreedy)
 David Milton-Jones (Albert) 
 Julie Peasgood (Cheryl Summerbee) 
 Frederick Jaeger (Siegfried von Turpitz)  
 Malcolm Storry (Ronald Frobisher)
 Peter Cellier (Felix Skinner)
 Lewis Fiander (Robin Dempsey) 
 Jeffrey Gardiner (Robert Sutcliffe)  
 Robert Flemyng (Arthur Kingfisher)
 Marie-Elise Grepne (Gloria)
 Guy Moore (Matthew Swallow) 
 Cecilia-Marie Carreon (Song-Mi Lee)
 Britt Morrow (Bernadette)

References

External links
 

1988 British television series debuts
1988 British television series endings
1980s British television miniseries
1980s British romantic comedy television series
British fantasy television series
ITV comedy
Television shows based on British novels
Television series based on Arthurian legend
Television series by ITV Studios
Television shows produced by Granada Television
English-language television shows